Momtaz Begum was an Awami League politician and the former Member of Parliament of reserved seat. She was married to Syed Rezaur Rahman, Member of Awami League Advisory Council.

Career
Begum was elected to the Constituent Assembly of Bangladesh in 1970. She was a former chairperson of Jatiya Mohila Sangstha and General Secretary of Bangladesh Mohila Awami League. She was elected to parliament from a reserved seat as an Awami League candidate in 1973.

Death
Begum died on 17 May 2020 in Bhooter Goli, Dhaka, Bangladesh.

References

Awami League politicians
2020 deaths
1st Jatiya Sangsad members
Women members of the Jatiya Sangsad
20th-century Bangladeshi women politicians